Vergennes can refer to:

People
 Charles Gravier, comte de Vergennes (1719–1787), French statesman and diplomat who directed his country during the American War of Independence
 Jean Gravier, marquis de Vergennes (1718-1794), French magistrate and diplomat, older brother of Charles Gravier

Places
 Vergennes, Illinois
 Vergennes, Vermont
 Vergennes Township, Michigan
 Vergennes (grape), a variety of grape used to make white wine